Canadian literature is the literature of a multicultural country, written in languages including Canadian English, Canadian French, Indigenous languages, and many others such as Canadian Gaelic. Influences on Canadian writers are broad both geographically and historically, representing Canada's diversity in culture and region.

Canadian literature is often divided into French- and English-language literatures, which are rooted in the literary traditions of France and Britain, respectively. The earliest Canadian narratives were of travel and exploration. This progressed into three major themes that can be found within historical Canadian literature; nature, frontier life, Canada's position within the world, all three of which tie into the garrison mentality, a condition shared by all colonial era societies in their beginnings, but sometimes erroneously thought to apply mainly to Canada because a Canadian intellectual coined the term. In recent decades Canada's literature has been strongly influenced by immigrants from around the world. Since the 1980s, Canada's ethnic and cultural diversity has been openly reflected in its literature, which by the 1990s was widely appreciated around the world.

Indigenous literature

Indigenous peoples of Canada are culturally diverse. Each group has its own literature, language and culture. The term "Indigenous literature" therefore can be misleading. As writer Jeannette Armstrong states in one interview,  "I would stay away from the idea of "Native" literature, there is no such thing. There is Mohawk literature, there is Okanagan literature, but there is no generic Native in Canada".

French-Canadian literature

In 1802, the Lower Canada legislative library was founded, being one of the first in Occident, the first in the Canada. For comparison, the library of the British House of Commons was founded sixteen years later. The library had some rare titles about geography, natural science and letters. All books it contained were moved to the Canadian parliament in Montreal when the two Canadas, lower and upper, were united. On April 25, 1849, a dramatic event occurred: the Canadian parliament was burned by furious people along with thousands of French Canadian books and a few hundred of English books. This is why some people still affirm today, falsely, that from the early settlements until the 1820s, Quebec had virtually no literature. Though historians, journalists, and learned priests published, overall the total output that remain from this period and that had been kept out of the burned parliament is small.

It was the rise of Quebec patriotism and the 1837 Lower Canada Rebellion, in addition to a modern system of primary school education, which led to the rise of French-Canadian fiction. L'influence d'un livre by Philippe-Ignace-Francois Aubert de Gaspé is widely regarded as the first French-Canadian novel. The genres which first became popular were the rural novel and the historical novel. French authors were influential, especially authors like Balzac.

In 1866, Father Henri-Raymond Casgrain became one of Quebec's first literary theorists. He argued that literature's goal should be to project an image of proper Catholic morality.  However, a few authors like Louis-Honoré Fréchette and Arthur Buies broke the conventions to write more interesting works.

This pattern continued until the 1930s with a new group of authors educated at the Université Laval and the Université de Montréal. Novels with psychological and sociological foundations became the norm. Gabrielle Roy and Anne Hébert even began to earn international acclaim, which had not happened to French-Canadian literature before. During this period, Quebec theatre, which had previously been melodramas and comedies, became far more involved.

French-Canadian literature began to greatly expand with the turmoil of the Second World War, the beginnings of industrialization in the 1950s, and most especially the Quiet Revolution in the 1960s. French-Canadian literature also began to attract a great deal of attention globally, with Acadian novelist Antonine Maillet winning the Prix Goncourt in 1979. An experimental branch of Québécois literature also developed; for instance the poet Nicole Brossard wrote in a formalist style.
In 1979, Roch Carrier wrote the story The Hockey Sweater, which highlighted the cultural and social tensions between English and French speaking Canada.

Before Confederation

Because Canada only officially became a country following the unification, or 'confederation' of several colonies, including Upper and Lower Canada, into one nation on July 1, 1867, it has been argued that literature written before this time was colonial. The book often considered to be the first work of Canadian literature is The History of Emily Montague by Frances Brooke, published in 1769. Brooke wrote the novel in Sillery, Quebec following the Conquest of New France. Susanna Moodie and Catharine Parr Traill, English sisters who adopted the country as their own, moved to Upper Canada in 1832. They recorded their experiences as pioneers in Parr Traill's The Backwoods of Canada (1836) and Canadian Crusoes (1852), and Moodie's Roughing It in the Bush (1852) and Life in the Clearings (1853). However, both women wrote until their deaths, placing them in the country for more than 50 years and certainly well past Confederation. Moreover, their books often dealt with survival and the rugged Canadian environment; these themes re-appear in other Canadian works, including Margaret Atwood's Survival. Moodie and Parr Trail's sister, Agnes Strickland, remained in England and wrote elegant royal biographies, creating a stark contrast between Canadian and English literatures.

However, one of the earliest Canadian writers virtually always included in Canadian literary anthologies is Thomas Chandler Haliburton (1796–1865), born and raised in Nova Scotia, who died just two years before Canada's official birth. He is remembered for his comic character, Sam Slick, who appeared in The Clockmaker and other humorous works throughout Haliburton's life.

After 1867

A group of poets now known as the "Confederation Poets", including Charles G. D. Roberts, Archibald Lampman, Bliss Carman, Duncan Campbell Scott, and William Wilfred Campbell, came to prominence in the 1880s and 1890s. Choosing the world of nature as their inspiration, their work was drawn from their own experiences and, at its best, written in their own tones. Isabella Valancy Crawford, Frederick George Scott, and Francis Sherman are also sometimes associated with this group.

During this period, E. Pauline Johnson and William Henry Drummond were writing popular poetry - Johnson's based on her part-Mohawk heritage, and Drummond, the Poet of the Habitant, writing dialect verse.

L. M. Montgomery's novel Anne of Green Gables was first published in 1908. It has sold an estimated 50 million copies and is one of the best selling books worldwide.

Between 1915 and 1925, Stephen Leacock (1869-1944) was the best selling humour writer in the world. His best known book of fiction, Sunshine Sketches of a Little Town was published in 1912. 

Three of Canada's most important post-World War I novelists were Hugh MacLennan (1907 – 1990), W.O. Mitchell (1914-1998), and Morley Callaghan (1903 – 1990). MacLennan's best-known works are Barometer Rising (1941), The Watch That Ends the Night (1957), and Two Solitudes (1945), while Callaghan is best known for Such Is My Beloved (1934), The Loved and the Lost (1951), and More Joy in Heaven (1937). Mitchell's most-loved novel is Who Has Seen the Wind. 
 
Perhaps reacting against a tradition that largely emphasized the wilderness and the small town and country experience, Leonard Cohen wrote the novel Beautiful Losers (1966). It was labelled by one reviewer "the most revolting book ever written in Canada". In time, however, this novel was considered a Canadian classic. Despite beginning his career as a poet of major importance, Cohen is perhaps best known as a folk singer and songwriter, with an international following.

Canadian author Farley Mowat is best known for his work Never Cry Wolf (1963) and his Governor General's Award-winning children's book, Lost in the Barrens (1956).

Following World War II, writers such as Mavis Gallant, Mordecai Richler, Norman Levine, Sheila Watson, Margaret Laurence and Irving Layton added to the Modernist influence in Canadian literature previously introduced by F. R. Scott, A. J. M. Smith and others associated with the McGill Fortnightly. This influence, at first, was not broadly appreciated. Norman Levine's Canada Made Me, a travelogue that presented a sour interpretation of the country in 1958, for example, was widely rejected.

After 1967, the country's centennial year, the national government increased funding to publishers and numerous small presses began operating throughout the country.
The best-known Canadian children's writers include L. M. Montgomery and Monica Hughes.

Contemporary Canadian literature: After 1967
Arguably, the best-known living Canadian writer internationally (especially since the deaths of Robertson Davies and Mordecai Richler) is Margaret Atwood, a prolific novelist, poet, and literary critic. Other great 20th-century Canadian authors include Margaret Laurence, Mavis Gallant, Michael Ondaatje, Carol Shields, Alistair MacLeod, Mazo de la Roche, and Gabrielle Roy.

This group, along with Nobel Laureate Alice Munro, who has been called the best living writer of short stories in English, were part of a 'new wave' of Canadian writers, some starting their careers in the 1950's. The first to elevate Canadian Literature to the world stage were Lucy Maud Montgomery, Stephen Leacock, Mazo de la Roche, and Morley Callaghan. During the post-war decades  Canadian literature, as were Australian and New Zealand literature, viewed as an appendage to British Literarure. When academic Clara Thomas decided in the 1940s to concentrate on Canadian literature for her master's thesis, the idea was so novel and so radical that word of her decision reached The Globe and Mail books editor William Arthur Deacon, who then personally reached out to Thomas to pledge his and the newspaper's resources in support of her work.

Other major Canadian novelists include Carol Shields, Lawrence Hill, and Alice Munro. Carol Shields novel The Stone Diaries won the 1995 Pulitzer Prize for Fiction, and another novel, Larry's Party, won the Orange Prize in 1998. Lawrence Hill's Book of Negroes won the 2008 Commonwealth Writers' Prize Overall Best Book Award, while Alice Munro became the first Canadian to win the Nobel Prize in Literature in 2013. Munro also received the Man Booker International Prize in 2009.

In the 1960s, a renewed sense of nation helped foster new voices in Canadian poetry, including: Margaret Atwood, Michael Ondaatje, Leonard Cohen, Eli Mandel and Margaret Avison. Others such as Al Purdy, Milton Acorn, and Earle Birney, already published, produced some of their best work during this period.

The TISH Poetry movement in Vancouver brought about poetic innovation from Jamie Reid, George Bowering, Fred Wah, Frank Davey, Daphne Marlatt, David Cull, and Lionel Kearns.
 Canadian poets have been expanding the boundaries of originality: Christian Bök, Ken Babstock, Karen Solie, Lynn Crosbie, Patrick Lane, George Elliott Clarke and Barry Dempster have all imprinted their unique consciousnesses onto the map of Canadian imagery. 
A notable anthology of Canadian poetry is The New Oxford book of Canadian Verse, edited by Margaret Atwood.

Anne Carson is probably the best known Canadian poet living today. Carson in 1996 won the Lannan Literary Award for poetry. The foundation's awards in 2006 for poetry, fiction and nonfiction each came with $US 150,000.

Canadian authors who have won international awards
Nobel Prize in Literature
 Alice Munro (2013)

International Booker Prize
 Alice Munro (2009)

Booker Prize
 Michael Ondaatje, The English Patient (1992)
 Margaret Atwood, The Blind Assassin (2000)
 Yann Martel, Life of Pi (2002) 
 Margaret Atwood, The Testaments (2019)

Pulitzer Prize for Fiction
 Carol Shields, The Stone Diaries  (1995)

National Book Critics Circle Award
 Carol Shields, The Stone Diaries  (1994)

International Dublin Literary Award
 Alistair MacLeod, No Great Mischief (2001) 
 Rawi Hage, De Niro's Game (2008)

Orange Prize
 Anne Michaels, Fugitive Pieces (1997)
 Carol Shields, Larry's Party (1998)

Commonwealth Writers' Prize
 Olive Senior, Summer Lightning (1987)
 Mordecai Richler, Solomon Gursky Was Here (1990)
 Rohinton Mistry, Such a Long Journey (1991)
 Rohinton Mistry, A Fine Balance (1996)
 Austin Clarke, The Polished Hoe (2003)
 Lawrence Hill, The Book of Negroes (2008)

Peace Prize of the German Book Trade
 Margaret Atwood (2017)

Awards
There are a number of notable Canadian awards for literature:
 The Atlantic Writers Competition highlights talent across the Atlantic Provinces.
 Books in Canada First Novel Award for the best first novel of the year
 Canadian Authors Association Awards for Adult Literature, honouring works by Canadian writers that achieve excellence without sacrificing popular appeal since 1975
 CBC Literary Awards
 Canada Council Molson Prize for distinguished contributions to Canada's cultural and intellectual heritage
 Danuta Gleed Literary Award for a first collection of short fiction by a Canadian author writing in English
 Dayne Ogilvie Prize for an emerging writer in the lesbian, gay, bisexual or transgender communities
 Doug Wright Awards for graphic literature and novels
 Floyd S. Chalmers Canadian Play Awards for best Canadian play staged by a Canadian theatre company
 Hilary Weston Writers' Trust Prize for Nonfiction for best work of nonfiction
 Gerald Lampert Award for the best new poet
 Lane Anderson Award for best Canadian non-fiction science
 Giller Prize for the best Canadian novel or book of short stories in English
 Governor General's Awards for the best Canadian fiction, poetry, non-fiction, drama, and translation, in both English and French
 Griffin Poetry Prize for the best book of poetry, one award each for a Canadian poet and an international poet
 Indigenous Voices Awards for works of literature by First Nations, Métis and Inuit writers
 Marian Engel Award for female writers in mid-career
 Matt Cohen Award to honour a Canadian writer for a lifetime of distinguished achievement
 Milton Acorn Poetry Awards for an outstanding "people's poet"
 National Business Book Award
 Pat Lowther Award for poetry written by a woman
International Council for Canadian Studies' Pierre Savard Award ( e.g. Faye Hammill for Literary Culture and Female Authorship in Canada)
 Prix Aurora Awards for Canadian science fiction and fantasy, in English and French
 RBC Bronwen Wallace Award for Emerging Writers
 Rogers Writers' Trust Fiction Prize for the best work of fiction
 Shaughnessy Cohen Award for Political Writing
 Stephen Leacock Award For Humour
 W.O. Mitchell Literary Prize for a writer who has made a distinguished lifetime contribution both to Canadian literature and to mentoring new writers
 Room of One's Own Annual Award for poetry and literature
 3-Day Novel Contest annual literary marathon, born in Canada
 Writers' Trust Engel/Findley Award for a distinguished writer in mid-career
 Writers' Trust / McClelland & Stewart Journey Prize

Awards For Children's and Young Adult Literature:
 Young Adult Novel Prize of the Atlantic Writers Competition
 R.Ross Annett Award for Children's Literature
 Geoffrey Bilson Award for Historical Fiction
 Ann Connor Brimer Award
 Canadian Library Association Book of the Year Award for Children
 CLA Young Adult Canadian Book Award
 Sheila A. Egoff Children's Literature Prize
 Elizabeth Mrazik-Cleaver Canadian Picture Book Award
 Floyd S. Chalmers Award for Theatre for Young Adults
 Amelia Frances Howard-Gibbon Illustrator's Award
 Information Book of the Year
 I0DE Book Award
 Max and Greta Ebel Memorial Award for Children's Writing
 Norma Fleck Award for children's non-fiction
 Governor-General's Awards for the best Canadian children's literature, text-based or illustrated, in both English and French
 QWF Prize for Children's and Young Adult Literature
 Vicky Metcalf Award for Children's Literature

Further reading

 K. Balachandran, K. (2007) Canadian Literature: An Overview. Sarup & Sons
 Eugene Benson and William Toye, eds. (1997) The Oxford companion to Canadian literature;  online. 1226 pp of short articles by experts.
 Faye Hammill (2007). Canadian literature. Edinburgh Univ. Press. 
 Jeffrey M. Heath (1991). Profiles in Canadian Literature, Volume 7. Dundurn Press. 
 William H. New (1990). Native writers and Canadian writing. UBC Press. 
 William H. New (2002). Encyclopedia of literature in Canada. Univ. Toronto Press. 
 William H. New (2003). A history of Canadian literature. McGill-Queen's Univ. Press. 
 Michael Newton (2015) Seanchaidh na Coille / The Memory-Keeper of the Forest: Anthology of Scottish-Gaelic Literature of Canada.
 Reingard M. Nischik (2008). History of literature in Canada: English-Canadian and French-Canadian. Camden House. 
 Pivato, Joseph (1994 and 2003). Echo: Essays on Other Literatures. Guernica Editions. 
 David Stouck (1988). Major Canadian authors: a critical introduction to Canadian literature in English. Univ. Nebraska Press. 
 Cynthia Sugars and Eleanor Ty, eds. (2015). Canadian Literature and Cultural Memory. Oxford Univ. Press, 493pp. Scholarly essays on how cultural memory is reflected in Canadian fiction, poetry, drama, films, etc.
 Elizabeth Waterston (1973). Survey; a short history of Canadian literature''. Methuen.

See also

 Regional–such as the prairie novel or Quebec theatre.
 By author: Canadian women; Acadians, Aboriginal peoples in Canada; Irish Canadians; Italian-Canadians:  South-Asian-Canadian 
 Literary period: "The Confederation Poets", "Canadian postmoderns" or "Canadian Poets Between the Wars."
 Canadian poetry
 Canadian science fiction
 List of Canadian writers
 List of Canadian short story writers
 The Canadian Centenary Series
 Canada Reads
 Canadian content
 Theatre of Canada

References

External links
Introduction – Canadian Writers – Library and Archives Canada
Canadian Literature – CanLit
Canadian Literature – Historica – The Canadian Encyclopedia Library
Canadian Writers – Resource for Canadian authors publishing in English or French – Athabasca University, Alberta
Studies in Canadian Literature – University of New Brunswick
Dominion of the North: Literary & Print Culture in Canada – An online exhibition celebrating prominent poets, authors, and historians. It comprises one hundred monographs, organized topically into eight collections.

 
North American literature
English-language literature
Canadiana